Miriyam Aouragh (Amsterdam, 18 November 1972) is a Dutch anthropologist who specializes in social media and internet activism. She is senior lecturer at the University of Westminster.

Biography
Aouragh was born to parents who had migrated to the Netherlands from Morocco. In the early 2000s, she was a student of virtual communities in Palestine, a member of the International Socialists, and active in Amsterdam as an activist for Moroccan youth and the Palestinian cause. She got her doctorate in cultural anthropology (including such topics as "Palestine in Cyberspace") from the University of Amsterdam in 2008; her dissertation, Palestine Online, studied internet activism in Palestine, Jordan, and Lebanon, and was published in 2011. She published on the use of the internet and social media during the Egyptian revolution of 2011, and her work on social media is cited in educational books.

References

External links
 Aouragh's blog

Living people
1972 births
Dutch anthropologists
University of Amsterdam alumni
Writers from Amsterdam
Internet activists
Dutch women anthropologists
Academics of the University of Westminster
Cultural anthropologists